Mr. Universe may refer to:

Bodybuilding contests
 NABBA Mr. Universe, a Pro/Am competition at the Universe Championships annual bodybuilding event.

Entertainment
 Jim Gaffigan: Mr. Universe, 2012 stand-up special by comedian Jim Gaffigan
 Mr. Universe (album), a 1979 album by the British rock band Gillan
 Mister Universe (film), the 1951 film debut of Vince Edwards
 Mister Universo (2016 film), fictional film in which 1957 Mr. Universe Arthur Robin plays himself
 Mr. Universe, a 1988 Hungarian feature film with a cameo by 1955 Mr. Universe Mickey Hargitay playing himself
 Mr. Universe, a character in the 2005 film Serenity
 Mr. Universe, the stage name of Greg Universe from Cartoon Network show Steven Universe